Jerrod may refer to:

Jerrod Calhoun
Jerrod Carmichael
Jerrod Heard
Jerrod Johnson
Jerrod Laventure
Jerrod Mustaf
Jerrod Niemann
Jerrod Riggan
Jerrod Sanders
Jerrod Sessler
Ben Jerrod